Osmar Schindler (December 21, 1867 – June 19, 1927) was a German painter belonging to the Dresden Academy school of artists. His works were considered a mixture of impressionism and Art Nouveau.

Life 

Osmar Schindler was born on December 22, 1867, in the village of Burkhardtsdorf, but grew up in the small town of Bischofswerda (both part of the German Empire), 33 km east of Dresden. He lost his father at an early age, and so with the support of his uncle, Schindler attended the Dresden Art Academy where he was taught by Ferdinand Pauwels and Leon Pohle with attending students including Sascha Schneider, Hans Unger and Richard Müller.

By 1895 Schindler had travelled to Belgium, the Netherlands, France, and Italy. In 1900 he was appointed professor of the Dresden Academy of Fine Arts. He led the Modellierklasse and counted George Grosz, Karl Hanusch, Bernhard Kretzschmar and Paul Wilhelm as his students as well as discovering Hanns Georgi.

He died on June 19, 1927, and was buried at Loschwitz Cemetery.

Works 

His works include landscapes, historical and figurative scenes as well as contributions to the interior décor of various buildings. For example, his vestry paintings Christ, the Light of the World (1927) can be found in the Church of Christ in his home of Bischofswerda. There is also a painting of a monumental altarpiece depicting the crucifixion of Christ at Christ Church (designed by Woldemar Kandler) in Dresden Klotzsche in 1905. His most recognizable works are Im Kumtlampenschein (1901) and David and Goliath (1888), as well as the portraits of the German engineer Christian Otto Mohr and the distinguished professor of the Dresden Academy of Fine Arts, Herman Prell.

Schindler was also involved in the Internationale Kunst Ausstellung in 1897. His work is generally considered influenced by impressionism, with his work displayed at the Staatliche Kunstsammlungen Dresden (SKD), his work for the Dresden exhibition in 1897 (Ausstellung), including his work within the various the churches, leaning toward Art Nouveau.

Controversy 

One of Schindler's works Mocking Christ was donated to the Fischerhude Church but has been the centre of controversy regarding its purported anti-Semitism.

References

External links 

 www.europeana.eu

1869 births
1927 deaths
People from Erzgebirgskreis
People from the Kingdom of Saxony
German Impressionist painters
Art Nouveau painters
19th-century German painters
19th-century German male artists
German male painters
20th-century German painters
20th-century German male artists